The Federal Correctional Institution, Danbury (FCI Danbury) is a low-security United States federal prison for male and female inmates in Danbury, Connecticut. It is operated by the Federal Bureau of Prisons, a division of the United States Department of Justice. The facility also has an adjacent satellite prison camp that houses minimum-security female offenders.

History
FCI Danbury was opened in August 1940 with the purpose of housing male and female inmates. It housed several high-profile political prisoners during World War II. Conscientious objectors, including poet Robert Lowell and civil rights activist James Peck, were housed there for refusing to enter the military draft in the early 1940s. Robert Henry Best served most of his life sentence at FCI Danbury after being convicted of treason in 1948 for making propaganda broadcasts for the Nazis during the war. Screenwriter Ring Lardner Jr., a member of the Hollywood 10, a group of filmmakers who were charged with contempt of Congress in 1947 for refusing to answer questions regarding their alleged connections with the Communist Party USA, served 9 months there.

Beginning in the 1970s, the Yale Law School began providing legal services for prisoners at FCI Danbury. As of the 2010s, Yale students and professors still regularly visit the facility.

FCI Danbury became exclusively for female inmates in 1993. This was because there was a lack of space for women in the Northeastern United States and due to the growth in the number of female prisoners.

In August 2013, the Federal Bureau of Prisons announced that FCI Danbury was going to be reverted to an all-male facility to alleviate overcrowding across the entire federal prison system. The female inmate population will be transferred to the Federal Correctional Institution, Aliceville in Alabama, which opened in 2013 and has over 1,500 low-security beds for female inmates. It was estimated that the change would be completed by December 2013. However, female inmates were not transferred to other facilities until April 2014.

FCI Danbury and its camp were the only federal prisons in the Northeast which housed women, and the repurposing would further promote an imbalance of women's prisoner space within the BOP system. In August 2013 11 senators from the Northeast sent a letter to the BOP director criticizing the move, since it would mean there would be no facility for female federal prisoners from the Northeast; the move would mean that all of the women would be far from their families and loved ones. In November of that year several senators announced that at FCI Danbury the BOP would install a new low security camp for women and convert an existing minimum security camp into a low security camp for women to remedy the issue. As of August 2014 there was no timeline for the installation of the new women's facilities, no new construction had yet occurred at FCI Danbury. U.S. citizens would be eligible for the camps, but non-U.S. citizens would still be incarcerated farther away. As of that time there were no federal women's prisons left in the Northeast. Orange Is the New Black: My Year in a Women's Prison writer Piper Kerman criticized the move in an op-ed in The New York Times. A new $25 million women's facility was completed and began accepting female inmates in December 2016.

Location and facilities

Four Amtrak stations are within  from the facility.

The prison had at one point included athletic facilities such as a running track, a soccer field, handball courts, a baseball diamond, and a handball field, since there is a large amount of outdoor area in the FCI Danbury property.

Programs
Prior to the facility's conversion it offered General Education Development (GED) programs, paralegal classes, a group therapy program for people with post-traumatic stress disorder called the "Bridge Program", and a residential drug abuse program. The prison chaplain, religious groups, and volunteer groups had offered educational and other programming. In addition, prior to 1999 the prison hosted a "children's day" so inmates could spend time with their children.

Notable incidents

Deadly 1977 fire
On July 7, 1977, at about 1:15 am, a fire began in an inmate's clothes hanging on wooden pegs in one of the prison washrooms, and before it was extinguished about 45 minutes later, five inmates had died of smoke inhalation. The most significant factors contributing to the deadly fire were the presence of fuels that promoted rapid flame and smoke development, the failure to evacuate occupants quickly and reliably (the two primary exits were blocked by the fire and a broken key in a lock, leaving a narrow catwalk as the only exit), and the fire not being extinguished in an incipient stage. An automatic sprinkler system would have been the most reliable fire defense; however, even without automatic detection and suppression equipment, the fire safety system, with little expenditure of money, could have been more effective by revisions to emergency procedures in the fire plan. The Danbury Fire Department was not called until about 15 minutes after the fire's discovery because of a fire plan that called for initial use of the institution's firefighting resources, but the inmate fire brigade was never released from housing units and the institution's fire apparatus was never used. The ensuing public outcry led to several investigations and reviews of the prison's fire safety systems and protocols. A comprehensive program of fuel control, additional fire detection and suppression equipment, and training and planning sessions have also been established, not only at FCI Danbury but throughout the rest of the federal prison system.

Correction Officer Michael Rudkin
In 2008, supervisory staff at FCI Danbury discovered that Correction Officer Michael Rudkin had been having consensual sexual relations with a female inmate. When questioned, Rudkin, who was married at the time, admitted to the affair and stated that it had been going on for approximately one year. An FBI and United States Department of Justice Office of the Inspector General  (OIG)  investigation revealed that Rudkin had sexual encounters with other inmates as well. Since it is illegal for prison staff to have sexual relations with inmates under their care regardless of consent, Rudkin pleaded guilty to sexual abuse of a ward and was sentenced to prison at the United States Penitentiary, Coleman, a high-security facility in Florida. Rudkin was subsequently convicted in 2010 of attempting to hire a hitman to kill his former inmate paramour, his ex-wife, his ex-wife's new boyfriend, and an OIG special agent assigned to his case while at USP Coleman. He was sentenced to 90 years in federal prison. Rudkin was severely beaten at the United States Penitentiary, Terre Haute on August 23, 2021 and died the following day at the age of 56.

In popular culture
The fictional Litchfield Prison in Upstate New York in the Netflix original television series Orange Is the New Black is based in part on FCI Danbury, where Piper Kerman, who wrote the memoir on which the series is based, was incarcerated in 2004 and 2005 after her conviction for money laundering and drug trafficking.

George Jung served a sentence at FCI Danbury. His incarceration was portrayed in the 2001 film Blow starring Johnny Depp.

The Weeds character Nancy Botwin serves time at FCI Danbury.

The Suits character Mike Ross begins Season 6 of the television show in FCI Danbury.

Gina Zanetakos of The Blacklist was incarcerated at FCI Danbury before she escaped.

In the 1995 movie The American President, Presidential Assistant Lewis Rothschild (played by Michael J. Fox) says "Say what you want. It's always the guy in my job that ends up doing 18 months in Danbury minimum security prison."

Notable inmates

See also

 List of U.S. federal prisons
 Federal Bureau of Prisons
 Incarceration of women in the United States

References
 Arons, Anna, Katherine Culver, Emma Kaufman, Jennifer Yun, Hope Metcalf, Megan Quattlebaum, and Judith Resnik. "Dislocation and Relocation: Women in the Federal Prison System and Repurposing FCI Danbury for Men". Yale Law School, Arthur Liman Public Interest Program. September 2014.

Notes

Further reading
Rosepiler, Vicki. "Martha Just One of Us". The Progressive Populist. September 2004. - A letter to the editor from an FCI Danbury inmate

External links
 FCI Danbury

Buildings and structures in Danbury, Connecticut
Danbury
Danbury
Danbury
1940 establishments in Connecticut